Westenra is an Irish surname, derived from the Dutch van Wassenaer. Notable people with the surname include:

Derrick Westenra, 5th Baron Rossmore (1853–1921), Irish soldier and author
Henry Westenra, 3rd Baron Rossmore (1792–1860), Irish Member of Parliament and peer
Henry Westenra (1742–1801), Irish Member of Parliament for Monaghan
Henry Westenra, 4th Baron Rossmore (1851–1874), Irish soldier and peer
John Westenra (1798–1874), Irish Member of Parliament for King's County
Peter Westenra (died 1693), Irish Member of Parliament for Athboy
Warner Westenra (1706–1772), Irish Member of Parliament for Maryborough
Warner Westenra, 2nd Baron Rossmore (1765–1842), Irish landowner and politician

 Hayley Westenra (1987-), New Zealand soprano, born in Christchurch.

Fictional people:

Lucy Westenra, character in 1897 novel Dracula

References